Luca Mastrantonio (born 27 May 1996) is an Italian footballer who plays as a defender for Union Omaha in USL League One.

Career

Ostia Mare
Mastrantonio played a single season for Serie D side Ostia Mare, making 28 appearances.

College & Thunder Bay Chill
In 2016, Mastrantonio moved to the United States to play college soccer at the University of Northwestern Ohio, where he scored 7 goals and tallied 3 assists in 23 appearances for the Racers.  The following year, he transferred to Rockhurst University in Kansas City, Missouri, making 21 appearances. For the NCAA Division II college, he helped lead the team to become Conference regular season and tournament champions with a 12-1-1 record, and was named to the NCAA Division II All-Tournament Team and All-Midwest Region.

In 2017, Mastrantonio appeared in the USL PDL for Thunder Bay Chill. In 2018, Mastrantonio didn't play a college season, but spent another season in the PDL with Thunder Bay, making 14 appearances.

Mastrantonio returned to play college soccer in 2019 at the University of California, Irvine, where he played 17 games and was named to the All-Big West First Team. He didn't play in 2020 due to the Big West season been cancelled due to the COVID-19 pandemic.

FC Tucson
On 1 March 2021, Mastrantonio signed with FC Tucson of USL League One. He made his debut on 19 June 2021, appearing as an injury-time substitute during a 0–0 draw with North Texas SC.

Union Omaha
Following Tucson's voluntary relegation to USL League Two, Mastrantonio signed with USL League One club Union Omaha.

References

1996 births
Association football defenders
Expatriate soccer players in the United States
FC Tucson players
Footballers from Rome
Italian expatriate footballers
Italian footballers
Italian expatriate sportspeople in the United States
Living people
Serie D players
Thunder Bay Chill players
UC Irvine Anteaters men's soccer players
USL League One players
USL League Two players
Expatriate soccer players in Canada
Italian expatriate sportspeople in Canada
Union Omaha players